Villa María  is a city in Córdoba Province, Argentina, and the head town of the General San Martín Department. It is located in the center of rich agricultural land. The area leads the country in production of milk .

The city lies 137 km southeast from the provincial capital, on the left bank of the Tercero River, near the geographical center of Argentina, at the intersection of National Routes 9 and 158, and right next to the Cordoba-Buenos Aires Highway, one of the nation's most important communication arteries.

Notable people 
 Sol Gabetta, cellist (1981)
 Rubén Magnano, basketball TD (1954)
 Mauro Rosales, football player (1981)
 Yayo Guridi, humorist (1965)
 Karina Jelinek, model (1981)
 José Aricó, writer (1931-1991)
 Amadeo Sabattini, politician (1892-1960)
 Juan Cruz Gill, football player (1983)
 Sebastián Brusco, football player (1974)
 Franco Jara, football player (1988)
 Albano Bizzarri, football player (1977)
 Marcelo Ingaramo, tennis player (1965)
 Magalí Romitelli, model (1987)

References

 H.R.Stones, British Railways in Argentina 1860-1948, P.E.Waters & Associates, Bromley, Kent, England, 1993.
 
 Official website
 Daily Newspaper
 Villa Maria Portal
 Study Centres Addresses in English in Villa María

Populated places in Córdoba Province, Argentina
Populated places established in 1867
Cities in Argentina
Argentina
Córdoba Province, Argentina